The Celebrity Apprentice Australia is an Australian reality television series which aired on the Nine Network. Based on NBC's The Apprentice, it first aired on 24 October 2011 and originally featured Mark Bouris, the founder and chairman of Wizard Home Loans and Yellow Brick Road, as the chief executive officer (CEO).

In July 2020, Nine reportedly commissioned Warner Brothers Australia, current owners of the franchise, to make a new season of The Celebrity Apprentice for 2021, with former series CEO Mark Bouris not returning. In September 2020, Nine confirmed at their yearly upfronts that the series will officially return in 2021 with British business magnate and The Apprentice UK host and CEO, Lord Alan Sugar leading the series, along with the reveal of Michelle Bridges, Michael "Wippa" Wipfli and Olivia Vivian as some of the competing celebrities. On 12 October, Nine announced the full list of celebrities competing in the season. In the same month, Josh Gibson and Scherri-Lee Biggs were also announced as competing celebrities. The season premiered on 23 May 2021.

In September 2021, the series was renewed for a sixth season with Lord Alan Sugar returning as CEO, and revealing Turia Pitt and Will & Woody as some of the competing celebrities. On 17 October 2021, Nine announced the full list of celebrities competing in the season.

In September 2022, the series was cancelled for a second time by Nine and won’t return in 2023.

Timeline of Personalities

Series overview

Teams by season

Seasons

Season 1 (2011)

A celebrity version of the series began to air on the Nine Network on 24 October 2011. It was won by comedian Julia Morris, who beat choreographer and So You Think You Can Dance Australia judge Jason Coleman in the final Boardroom.

Season 2 (2012)

The second season of The Celebrity Apprentice Australia began to air on the Nine Network on 18 April 2012. It was eventually won by television and music industry personality Ian Dickson, who beat reality star Nathan Jolliffe in the final Boardroom.

Season 3 (2013)

The third season of The Celebrity Apprentice Australia began to air on the Nine Network on 30 April 2013. It was won by Olympic Gold Champion Stephanie Rice, who beat fellow olympian John Steffensen in the final Boardroom.

Season 4 (2015)

The fourth season of The Celebrity Apprentice Australia began airing on the Nine Network on 16 September 2015, following a one-year absence. Kerri-Anne Kennerley and Shelley Barrett replace Dane Bouris and Deborah Thomas as advisors. This season ends with Sophie Monk reigning supreme and defeating former Big Brother champion Tim Dormer in the final Boardroom.

Season 5 (2021)

The fifth season of The Celebrity Apprentice Australia began airing on the Nine Network on 23 May 2021, following a six-year absence. The winning celebrity will receive $100,000 for their chosen charity. The season was won by Shaynna Blaze, who beat fellow celebrity Ross Noble in the final Boardroom.

Season 6 (2022)

The sixth season of The Celebrity Apprentice Australia began airing on the Nine Network on 22 May 2022. The winning celebrity will receive $100,000 for their chosen charity. The season was won by Benji Marshall, who beat fellow celebrity Darren McMullen in the final Boardroom.

Ratings

References

External links
 
 Celebrity Apprentice on NineMSN Website
 Celebrity Apprentice on 9Now Website
 FremantleMedia Australia — Production Website
 WBITVP Australia — Production Website
 

The Apprentice (franchise)
Australian television series based on American television series
Nine Network original programming
2010s Australian reality television series
2011 Australian television series debuts
2013 Australian television series endings
2015 Australian television series debuts
2020s Australian reality television series
Television series by Warner Bros. Television Studios
Television series by Fremantle (company)
Television series by MGM Television